Chertsey is a town in the Ashburton District, of New Zealand's South Island. It is located close to State Highway 1, which bypasses the town to the west, between Ashburton and Rakaia on the Canterbury Plains.

History

European settlement 
In 1872 the first Crown land grant was opened and the following year W.A. Brown took up land in Chertsey. He would name the district Chertsey after the town in England where his wife was born and where he had lived. In 1876 Thomas Wilkinson took up land in the district, and the following year the village was surveyed and officially named Chertsey. A 21-room hotel was built along with a blacksmith and a post office. This was shortly followed by a butcher's shop, two general stores, a bakery and a coal and timber yard.

Oil drilling 
The Canterbury Petroleum Prospecting Company started drilling for oil in 1914 and it was ceased in 1921. Oil was found at 420 metres below at Chertsey 1. In September 1921 a drill bit had broken down the well and with the sandy ground surrounding the well they were unable to retrieve it. In the late 1960s J.D. George 1 well was drilled about 10 km south of Chertsey 1, oil seepages were found at 1650 metres but this well was discontinued.

The fire of 1926 
"The Big Fire" of 1926 had devastating effects on the Chertsey district. The fire was caused by a train starting at the Chertsey township and travelled 20 km to the coast. When it reached Taverners Road several kilometres from its start point the front of the fire was over 3 km wide. One local farmer lost his life while trying to plough a fire break when he was overcome by the speed of the fast moving fire. Many of the districts farms lost a significant amount of livestock. The Minister of Railways at the time was reluctant to acknowledge responsibility, but on the intervention of Prime Minister Gordon Coates payment for about half of the assessed damaged was received.

Post World War II 
By the 1960s only the Chertsey general store, Chertsey Hotel and the Agricultural engineering manufacture remained in the community. Following transport advances and with the development of large supermarkets in nearby Ashburton, Chertsey store was forced to close in the 1990s. The Chertsey Tavern closed its doors in 2013 leaving Chertsey's second hand bookstore the only remaining business.

With New Zealand's dairy industry boom, Chertsey has seen large population growths, with many farms converting from sheep and mixed farming to dairying.

Education 
Chertsey School is a contributing primary school catering for years 1 to 6. It has  students as of  The school opened in 1878.

Sports 

Chertsey Domain has held the majority of Chertsey community sports since the late 1800s.

Rugby union was first played in the late 1880s. This continued up until World War 1.

Rugby League is the only current team sport representing Chertsey, the Chertsey Oilers currently play in the Aoraki Rugby League competition.

Softball was played in Chertsey in the late 1990s, with the "Chertsey Chuckers" competing in the Ashburton Softball competition.

Cricket was set up in the 1970s and was a regular feature at the Chertsey domain throughout the 1970s.

Harness racing is a popular sport in the district, and in 1994 Chertsey trainer Colin Calvert won the New Zealand Trotting Cup with Bee Bee Cee, Greyhound racing is also held at the Chertsey domain greyhound track.

Notable residents 

Patrick "Peter" Harvey (3 April 1880 – 29 October 1949), Played rugby union for both the Chertsey and Rakaia clubs. Selected for the All Blacks, gaining a test cap against the touring Great Britain side in 1904.
Clinton Stringfellow (26 February 1905 – 4 January 1959), born in Chertsey. In 1905 Stringfellow was a member of the New Zealand national side, on their 1929 tour of Australia. On that tour, he played seven matches, including two internationals, scoring 16 points.
William Lister, 1935 and 1938 New Zealand Light heavyweight champion first winning the title in 1935. Lister again won the title by beating his brother, Tom, in 1938.
Tom Lister, 1938 New Zealand light heavyweight champion, son Tom Lister was a New Zealand rugby union representative playing 8 test matches for the All Blacks from 1969-1971. Another son, John, was a professional golfer.
Catherine "Kate" Wilkinson (born 3 August 1957) was a member of the New Zealand House of Representatives for the National Party from 2005 until her retirement in 2014.

Demographics

The statistical area had a population of 1,611 at the 2018 New Zealand census, an increase of 9 people (0.6%) since the 2013 census, and an increase of 189 people (13.3%) since the 2006 census. There were 600 households. There were 867 males and 747 females, giving a sex ratio of 1.16 males per female. The median age was 34.6 years (compared with 37.4 years nationally), with 381 people (23.6%) aged under 15 years, 294 (18.2%) aged 15 to 29, 780 (48.4%) aged 30 to 64, and 156 (9.7%) aged 65 or older.

Ethnicities were 83.1% European/Pākehā, 7.3% Māori, 0.9% Pacific peoples, 13.0% Asian, and 1.9% other ethnicities (totals add to more than 100% since people could identify with multiple ethnicities).

The proportion of people born overseas was 21.4%, compared with 27.1% nationally.

Although some people objected to giving their religion, 45.1% had no religion, 46.6% were Christian, 1.1% were Hindu, 0.2% were Muslim, 0.4% were Buddhist and 2.2% had other religions.

Of those at least 15 years old, 210 (17.1%) people had a bachelor or higher degree, and 228 (18.5%) people had no formal qualifications. The median income was $42,600, compared with $31,800 nationally. The employment status of those at least 15 was that 735 (59.8%) people were employed full-time, 234 (19.0%) were part-time, and 24 (2.0%) were unemployed.

References

External links 
 https://web.archive.org/web/20111108160842/http://www.nzs.com/new-zealand-maps/canterbury/chertsey/

Ashburton District
Populated places in Canterbury, New Zealand